For the 1968 Vuelta a España, the field consisted of 90 riders; 51 finished the race.

By rider

By nationality

References

1968 Vuelta a España
1968